Cormac Roth (some sources Roche) was Archdeacon of Armagh from 1535 until 1548:he was also Rector of Heynestown, Vicar of Termonfeckin and Prebendary of Kene in Armagh cathedral.

Notes

16th-century Irish Roman Catholic priests
Archdeacons of Armagh